The 1939 U.S. National Championships (now known as the US Open) was a tennis tournament that took place on the outdoor grass courts at the West Side Tennis Club, Forest Hills in New York City, United States. The tournament ran from 7 September until 17 September. It was the 59th staging of the U.S. National Championships and the fourth Grand Slam tennis event of the year.

Finals

Men's singles

 Bobby Riggs defeated  Welby van Horn  6–4, 6–2, 6–4

Women's singles

 Alice Marble defeated  Helen Jacobs  6–0, 8–10, 6–4

Men's doubles
 Adrian Quist /  John Bromwich defeated  Jack Crawford /  Harry Hopman 8–6, 6–1, 6–4

Women's doubles
 Sarah Palfrey /  Alice Marble defeated  Kay Stammers /  Freda James Hammersley 7–5, 8–6

Mixed doubles
 Alice Marble /   Harry Hopman defeated  Sarah Palfrey /  Elwood Cooke 9–7, 6–1

References

External links
Official US Open website

 
U.S. National Championships
U.S. National Championships (tennis) by year
U.S. National Championships
U.S. National Championships
U.S. National Championships